Antissa is a genus of flies in the family Stratiomyidae.

Species
Antissa cuprea (Walker, 1849)

References

Stratiomyidae
Brachycera genera
Taxa named by Francis Walker (entomologist)
Diptera of Australasia